Might As Well is the title of multiple pieces of music, including:

"Might As Well (Future song)", a track from the 2017 album Future by Future
"Might As Well (The Grateful Dead song)", a piece from multiple releases by the Grateful Dead after 2004
"Might As Well (The Raspberries song)," a track from the 1972 album Fresh by the Raspberries

See also
Might As Well Be Dead
"Might As Well Dance"